Athy Cricket Club was founded in 1872 and was one of the first cricket clubs in Kildare.

References

Cricket clubs established in 1872
Cricket clubs in Leinster
Sports clubs in County Kildare
1872 establishments in Ireland